"Talk to My Heart" is a song recorded by Canadian country music artist Joan Kennedy. It was released in 1993 as the second single from her fifth studio album, Higher Ground. It peaked at number 7 on the RPM Country Tracks chart in June 1993.

Chart performance

Year-end charts

References

1992 songs
1993 singles
Joan Kennedy (musician) songs
MCA Records singles
Songs written by Mark D. Sanders